Don't Do Anything is the eleventh studio album by American singer and songwriter Sam Phillips. The album is Phillips' first to be self-produced and was released on June 3, 2008.

On September 15, 2008 a live webcast of NPR's In Concert series from The Ram's Head in Annapolis, MD showcased the album.

"Sister Rosetta Goes Before Us" was recorded by Robert Plant and Alison Krauss for their 2007 album Raising Sand. Phillips stated the song was inspired by Sister Rosetta Tharpe.

Track listing

Personnel
 Sam Phillips – vocals, guitar, piano
 Patrick Warren – pump organ
 Paul Bryan – bass guitar
 Jennifer Condos – bass guitar
 Jay Bellerose – drums
 The Section Quartet 
 Eric Gorfain – Stroh violin, banjo, guitar, mandolin, piano
 Daphne Chen – violin
 Leah Katz – viola
 Richard Dodd – cello

References

Sam Phillips (musician) albums
2008 albums
Nonesuch Records albums